The NER Class S1 (LNER Class B14) was a class of 4-6-0 steam locomotives of the North Eastern Railway. It was designed by Wilson Worsdell and five locomotives were built between 1900 and 1901 at Gateshead works. The S1 was similar to the NER Class S but had larger driving wheels and a higher boiler pressure.

Modifications
Schmidt superheaters and longer smokeboxes were fitted between 1913 and 1917.

Use
When built, the S1s hauled heavy passenger expresses between York, Newcastle, and Edinburgh. They were gradually replaced on these services by NER Class R and NER Class R1 4-4-0s. From 1907, they were mainly used for hauling fish trains.

Locomotive details

Withdrawal
All five locomotives were withdrawn between 1929 and 1931 and none were preserved.

References

4-6-0 locomotives
S1
Railway locomotives introduced in 1900
Scrapped locomotives
Standard gauge steam locomotives of Great Britain
Passenger locomotives